Earth Junk is a studio album by indie rock band The Howling Hex.  It was released by Drag City in 2008.

Track listing
All songs written by the Howling Hex except where noted.
"Big Chief Big Wheel" – 2:50
"Sundays Are Ruined Again" – 3:09
"Annie Get Redzy" – 3:23
"Faithful Sister" – 1:56
"Contraband & Betrayal" (Angel Gonzalez) – 4:00
"No Good Reason" – 3:04
"The Arrows" – 3:03
"Blood & Dust" – 4:05
"Coffin Up Cash" – 6:19
"O Why, Sports Coat?" – 1:15

Personnel

The Howling Hex:
Neil Michael Hagerty – guitar, voice, electronics
Sweney Tidball – Hammond B3, Fender Rhodes, synthesizer
Eleanor Whitmore – voice

References

2008 albums
Howling Hex albums
Drag City (record label) albums